In mathematics, a topological space is, roughly speaking, a geometrical space in which closeness is defined but cannot necessarily be measured by a numeric distance. More specifically, a topological space is a set whose elements are called points, along with an additional structure called a topology, which can be defined as a set of neighbourhoods for each point that satisfy some axioms formalizing the concept of closeness. There are several equivalent definitions of a topology, the most commonly used of which is the definition through open sets, which is easier than the others to manipulate.

A topological space is the most general type of a mathematical space that allows for the definition of limits, continuity, and connectedness. Common types of topological spaces include Euclidean spaces, metric spaces and manifolds.

Although very general, the concept of topological spaces is fundamental, and used in virtually every branch of modern mathematics. The study of topological spaces in their own right is called point-set topology or general topology.

History 
Around 1735, Leonhard Euler discovered the formula  relating the number of vertices, edges and faces of a convex polyhedron, and hence of a planar graph. The study and generalization of this formula, specifically by  Cauchy (1789-1857) and  L'Huilier (1750-1840),  boosted the study of topology. In 1827, Carl Friedrich Gauss published General investigations of curved surfaces, which in section 3 defines the curved surface in a similar manner to the modern topological understanding: "A curved surface is said to possess continuous curvature at one of its points A, if the direction of all the straight lines drawn from A to points of the surface at an infinitely small distance from A are deflected infinitely little from one and the same plane passing through A."

Yet, "until  Riemann's work in the early 1850s, surfaces were always dealt with from a local point of view (as parametric surfaces) and topological issues were never considered". " Möbius and  Jordan seem to be the first to realize that the main problem about the topology of (compact) surfaces is to find invariants (preferably numerical) to decide the equivalence of surfaces, that is, to decide whether two surfaces are  homeomorphic or not."

The subject is clearly defined by Felix Klein in his "Erlangen Program" (1872): the geometry invariants of arbitrary continuous transformation, a kind of geometry. The term "topology" was introduced by Johann Benedict Listing in 1847, although he had used the term in correspondence some years earlier instead of previously used "Analysis situs". The foundation of this science, for a space of any dimension, was created by Henri Poincaré. His first article on this topic appeared in 1894. In the 1930s, James Waddell Alexander II and Hassler Whitney first expressed the idea that a surface is a topological space that is locally like a Euclidean plane.

Topological spaces were first defined by Felix Hausdorff in 1914 in his seminal "Principles of Set Theory". Metric spaces had been defined earlier in 1906 by Maurice Fréchet, though it was Hausdorff who popularised the term "metric space".

Definitions 

The utility of the concept of a topology is shown by the fact that there are several equivalent definitions of this mathematical structure. Thus one chooses the axiomatization suited for the application.

Definition via neighbourhoods 

This axiomatization is due to Felix Hausdorff.
We allow  to be empty.

 Any neighbourhood  of  includes a neighbourhood  of  such that  is a neighbourhood of each point of 

The first three axioms for neighbourhoods have a clear meaning. The fourth axiom has a very important use in the structure of the theory, that of linking together the neighbourhoods of different points of 

Conversely, when given the open sets of a topological space, the neighbourhoods satisfying the above axioms can be recovered by defining  to be a neighbourhood of  if  includes an open set  such that

Definition via open sets  

 The empty set and  itself belong to 
 Any arbitrary (finite or infinite) union of members of  belongs to 
 The intersection of any finite number of members of  belongs to 

As this definition of a topology is the most commonly used, the set  of the open sets is commonly called a topology on  

A subset  is said to be  in  if its complement  is an open set.

Examples of topologies 

 Given  the family  of six subsets of  forms another topology of 

Definition via closed sets 
Using de Morgan's laws, the above axioms defining open sets become axioms defining closed sets:

 The intersection of any collection of closed sets is also closed.
 The union of any finite number of closed sets is also closed.

Other definitions 
There are many other equivalent ways to define a topological space: in other words the concepts of neighbourhood, or that of open or closed sets can be reconstructed from other starting points and satisfy the correct axioms.

Another way to define a topological space is by using the Kuratowski closure axioms, which define the closed sets as the fixed points of an operator on the power set of 

A net is a generalisation of the concept of sequence.  A topology is completely determined if for every net in  the set of its accumulation points is specified.

Comparison of topologies 

A variety of topologies can be placed on a set to form a topological space.

Continuous functions 

A function  between topological spaces is called continuous if for every  and every neighbourhood  of  there is a neighbourhood  of  such that  This relates easily to the usual definition in analysis. Equivalently,  is continuous if the inverse image of every open set is open.  This is an attempt to capture the intuition that there are no "jumps" or "separations" in the function.  A homeomorphism is a bijection that is continuous and whose inverse is also continuous.  Two spaces are called  if there exists a homeomorphism between them.  From the standpoint of topology, homeomorphic spaces are essentially identical.

In category theory, one of the fundamental categories is Top, which denotes the category of topological spaces whose objects are topological spaces and whose morphisms are continuous functions.  The attempt to classify the objects of this category (up to homeomorphism) by invariants has motivated areas of research, such as homotopy theory, homology theory, and K-theory.

Examples of topological spaces 
A given set may have many different topologies.  If a set is given a different topology, it is viewed as a different topological space.  Any set can be given the discrete topology in which every subset is open.  The only convergent sequences or nets in this topology are those that are eventually constant.  Also, any set can be given the trivial topology (also called the indiscrete topology), in which only the empty set and the whole space are open.  Every sequence and net in this topology converges to every point of the space.  This example shows that in general topological spaces, limits of sequences need not be unique. However, often topological spaces must be Hausdorff spaces where limit points are unique.

Metric spaces 

Metric spaces embody a metric, a precise notion of distance between points.

Every metric space can be given a metric topology, in which the basic open sets are open balls defined by the metric.  This is the standard topology on any normed vector space. On a finite-dimensional vector space this topology is the same for all norms.

There are many ways of defining a topology on  the set of real numbers. The set of all open intervals forms a base or basis for the topology, meaning that every open set is a union of some collection of sets from the base. In particular, this means that a set is open if there exists an open interval of non zero radius about every point in the set. More generally, the Euclidean spaces  can be given a topology. In the usual topology on  the basic open sets are the open balls. Similarly,  the set of complex numbers, and  have a standard topology in which the basic open sets are open balls.

Proximity spaces

Uniform spaces

Function spaces

Cauchy spaces

Convergence spaces

Grothendieck sites

Other spaces 

If  is a filter on a set  then  is a topology on 

Many sets of linear operators in functional analysis are endowed with topologies that are defined by specifying when a particular sequence of functions converges to the zero function.

Any local field has a topology native to it, and this can be extended to vector spaces over that field.

Every manifold has a natural topology since it is locally Euclidean.

The Zariski topology is defined algebraically on the spectrum of a ring or an algebraic variety.  On  or  the closed sets of the Zariski topology are the solution sets of systems of polynomial equations.

A linear graph has a natural topology that generalizes many of the geometric aspects of graphs with vertices and edges.

The Sierpiński space is the simplest non-discrete topological space.  It has important relations to the theory of computation and semantics.

There exist numerous topologies on any given finite set. Such spaces are called finite topological spaces. Finite spaces are sometimes used to provide examples or counterexamples to conjectures about topological spaces in general.

Any set can be given the cofinite topology in which the open sets are the empty set and the sets whose complement is finite.  This is the smallest T1 topology on any infinite set.

Any set can be given the cocountable topology, in which a set is defined as open if it is either empty or its complement is countable.  When the set is uncountable, this topology serves as a counterexample in many situations.

The real line can also be given the lower limit topology. This example shows that a set may have many distinct topologies defined on it.

Outer space of a free group  consists of the so-called "marked metric graph structures" of volume 1 on

Topological constructions 
Every subset of a topological space can be given the subspace topology in which the open sets are the intersections of the open sets of the larger space with the subset.  For any indexed family of topological spaces, the product can be given the product topology, which is generated by the inverse images of open sets of the factors under the projection mappings. For example, in finite products, a basis for the product topology consists of all products of open sets. For infinite products, there is the additional requirement that in a basic open set, all but finitely many of its projections are the entire space.

A common example of a quotient topology is when an equivalence relation is defined on the topological space   The map  is then the natural projection onto the set of equivalence classes.

The Vietoris topology on the set of all non-empty subsets of a topological space  named for Leopold Vietoris, is generated by the following basis: for every -tuple  of open sets in  we construct a basis set consisting of all subsets of the union of the  that have non-empty intersections with each  

The Fell topology on the set of all non-empty closed subsets of a locally compact Polish space  is a variant of the Vietoris topology, and is named after mathematician James Fell.

Classification of topological spaces 

Topological spaces can be broadly classified, up to homeomorphism, by their topological properties.  A topological property is a property of spaces that is invariant under homeomorphisms.  To prove that two spaces are not homeomorphic it is sufficient to find a topological property not shared by them.  Examples of such properties include connectedness, compactness, and various separation axioms. For algebraic invariants see algebraic topology.

Topological spaces with algebraic structure 
For any algebraic objects we can introduce the discrete topology, under which the algebraic operations are continuous functions.  For any such structure that is not finite, we often have a natural topology compatible with the algebraic operations, in the sense that the algebraic operations are still continuous.  This leads to concepts such as topological groups, topological vector spaces, topological rings and local fields.

Topological spaces with order structure 
 Spectral: A space is spectral if and only if it is the prime spectrum of a ring (Hochster theorem).
 Specialization preorder:  In a space the specialization preorder (or canonical preorder) is defined by  if and only if  where  denotes an operator satisfying the Kuratowski closure axioms.

See also 

 
 Complete Heyting algebra – The system of all open sets of a given topological space ordered by inclusion is a complete Heyting algebra.

Citations

Bibliography 

 
 Bredon, Glen E., Topology and Geometry (Graduate Texts in Mathematics), Springer; 1st edition (October 17, 1997). .
 Bourbaki, Nicolas; Elements of Mathematics: General Topology, Addison-Wesley (1966).
  (3rd edition of differently titled books) 
 Čech, Eduard; Point Sets, Academic Press (1969).
 Fulton, William, Algebraic Topology, (Graduate Texts in Mathematics), Springer; 1st edition (September 5, 1997). .
 
 
 Lipschutz, Seymour; Schaum's Outline of General Topology, McGraw-Hill; 1st edition (June 1, 1968). .
 Munkres, James; Topology, Prentice Hall; 2nd edition (December 28, 1999). .
 Runde, Volker; A Taste of Topology (Universitext), Springer; 1st edition (July 6, 2005). .
 
 Steen, Lynn A. and Seebach, J. Arthur Jr.; Counterexamples in Topology, Holt, Rinehart and Winston (1970). .

External links 

 

General topology